VIA 57 West (marketed as VIΛ 57WEST) is a residential building located at 625 West 57th Street between 11th and 12th Avenues in Hell's Kitchen, Manhattan, New York City.  The pyramid shaped tower block or "tetrahedron", designed by the Danish architecture firm Bjarke Ingels Group (BIG), rises  and is 35 stories tall.

Context

Bjarke Ingels met the New York developer Douglas Durst in the early 2000s when he was in Denmark. Durst, who visited Ingels' Copenhagen studio in February 2010, found him very inventive, noting that unlike other architects, "What was striking about his work was that each design was so different, and designed for the locale."

In spring 2009, Durst Fetner Residential commissioned BIG to bring a new residential typology to Manhattan. In 2011, BIG opened an office in New York to supervise W57's development and construction. According to The New York Times, the name was chosen "because the southbound West Side Highway slopes down as drivers enter the city, right at the spot where the building is situated", serving as an entrance to Manhattan "via 57th".

Design 
VIA 57 West is Ingels's first New York project. From Manhattan, the 709-unit building resembles a distorted pyramid with a steeply sloped facade, rising  toward the northeast. Across the river in Weehawken, New Jersey, the building's sloped facade gives the appearance of an extra large sailing vessel making its way across the Hudson River.

With its angular balconies around an integrated green plaza, the block will connect with the waterfront and the Hudson River Park, taking full account of the surroundings while providing fine views with little traffic noise. The building has a floor area of  including residential and retail programming. The northern facade of the building features a number of balconies skewed at a 45-degree angle, a pattern employed in Ingels's previous works, such as the VM Houses in the Ørestad section of Copenhagen.

Reception
The triangular structure has been described as a hybrid between a European perimeter block and a traditional Manhattan high-rise. One reviewer described it as a torqued pyramid or "a quarter of a watermelon that’s had a large chunk surgically extracted from its center." It was given the Emporis Best Skyscraper design award in 2016.

Other features
Landmark Theatres ran an eight screen theatre on the ground floor of the building. The theatre closed in August 2020 following nearly three years of operation after struggling to attract moviegoers, in part due to the location's distance to public transit.

Awards
 2016 CTBUH Tall Building Awards: Best Tall Building Americas
 2016 International Highrise Award

References
Notes

Further reading
 
 BIG Architects, Bjarke Ingels Group Projects 2001–2010, Design Media Publishing Ltd, 2011. .

External links

Apartment buildings in New York City
Bjarke Ingels buildings
Hell's Kitchen, Manhattan
Pyramids in the United States
Skyscrapers on 57th Street (Manhattan)
Residential skyscrapers in Manhattan
Residential buildings completed in 2016
2016 establishments in New York City
West Side Highway